Sea Girls are an English indie rock band formed in 2015, comprising four members: Henry Camamile (vocals, guitar), Rory Young (lead guitar), Andrew Dawson (bass), and Oli Khan (drums).

The band are known for their indie pop anthems and energetic live shows. Their first release under Polydor, "Damage Done", was released on 7 May 2019.  Their debut single, "Call Me Out" was released on Almanac Recordings on 1 June 2017, followed by their debut EP of the same name on 8 June 2017. They released their second EP Heavenly War on 4 January 2018. Adored, the band's third EP, was released on 5 June 2018. Their first EP under Polydor, Under Exit Lights, was released on 6 March 2020. They have released two studio albums: Open Up Your Head (2020) and Homesick (2022), both charted within the UK Top 3.

History

Formation and early beginning
The members individually hail from Leicestershire, Kent, and Lincolnshire. Although the band was not officially formed until 2015, it was in secondary  school that the members had all met. During this time each member had played in separate bands, and it was not until they all eventually settled in London that they come together to form their own. 

The band's name came from a misheard lyric of a Nick Cave song, "Water's Edge". Guitarist Rory Young loves the song but always sung the words as 'sea girls' instead of 'city girls'. When asked about the name, drummer Oli Khan said, "We liked the nostalgia and whimsiness of it, but we also just needed a name pretty quickly at the time!"

2017–2019: Call Me Out, Heavenly War, and Adored
The band's debut single, "Call Me Out", was self-released on 1 June 2017. This live fan favourite was succeeded by the release of a four-track EP of the same name on 8 June 2017. Their second EP, Heavenly War, was released on 4 January 2018. A third EP, Adored, was released on 5 June 2018 as a tribute to the band's first single, "Call Me Out". To celebrate this anniversary, Sea Girls released this EP as a special edition 7" vinyl. These EPs were all self-released before the band eventually signed with Polydor Records in 2019. 

Sea Girls started out the 2018 festival season at the BBC Music festival The Biggest Weekend 26 May 2018 in Swansea. They went on to play the Reading and Leeds Festivals on 25 and 26 August 2018. The band was invited back to play the festival the following year in 2019.

Their last single of 2018, "All I Want to Hear You Say", released 11 September, set the band up to be featured as part of predicted successful acts of 2019 by multiple sources. In December 2018, it was announced that Sea Girls had been included in the BBC's Sound of 2019 poll. The band were also included on predictors of successful acts in 2019 by Radio X, It's All Indie, and Dork. It was announced in May 2019 that the group had signed a worldwide multi-album deal with Polydor Records. Their first release under Polydor, "Damage Done", was released on 7 May 2019. It was then named by Annie Mac as the hottest record in the world on BBC Radio 1 Annie Mac show. The band's second single released under Polydor was "Violet" on 20 August of the same year, and was once again praised as the hottest record in the world by Annie Mac. 

Shortly after the band's first signed release it was also announced that they would be supporting Russian and Ukraine tour dates in August of Foals's Everything Not Saved Will Be Lost World Tour. In December 2019 the band completed their first American tour, playing shows at the Mercury Lounge in New York City and at the Hotel Café in Los Angeles. Sea Girls closed out 2019 with an inclusion in the MTV Push: Ones To Watch 2020 shortlist.

2020:  Under Exit Lights and Open Up Your Head
Their first release of 2020, "Ready For More", was released in January 2020, along with the announcement of their first EP under Polydor; Under Exit Lights which was released on 6 March 2020. Their debut album, Open Up Your Head, was released on 14 August 2020 and peaked at number 3 on the UK Albums Chart; having been announced on 29 April 2020 along with the release of single "Do You Really Wanna Know?". Album launch shows across record stores in the UK were set for November 2020 and January 2021, but later rescheduled several times due to the COVID-19 pandemic and finally were done in August and September 2021.

2021–present: Homesick
The band's first release of 2021, a cover of "Nothing Breaks Like a Heart" by Mark Ronson and Miley Cyrus, was released on 12 February 2021. Later, on 9 August 2021, they announced that their second album, Homesick, was set for release on 14 January 2022. However, in December 2021, they stated that the album was delayed until 25 March 2022, but then in early March 2022, they moved the album release one week early to 18 March 2022. Homesick peaked at number 3 on the UK Albums Chart, making it their second attempt to have consecutively charted at the same position. On 23 April 2022, they released a post album single, "DNA", in an exclusive limited 7" vinyl for the 15th anniversary of Record Store Day. It was then released digitally on 5 May 2022, alongside the music video. In support of the album release, intimate record store shows were held across the UK in May 2022 as well as a European and UK headline tour in November and December 2022.

On 6 September 2022, they premiered a standalone single, "Falling Apart". It has heavy The Sopranos references, as it was written after Camamile watched the series. On 22 September 2022, it was announced that the song is featured on the FIFA 23 official soundtrack. 

In the same year, they supported German rock band Giant Rooks on their German Rookery Tour dates. They also played their debut set at Glastonbury Festival and debut headliner set at 110 Above Festival.

Members
 Henry Camamile – vocals, guitar (2015–present)
 Rory Young – lead guitar, backing vocals (2015–present)
 Andrew Dawson – bass, backing vocals (2015–present)
 Oli Khan – drums, percussion, keyboard (2015–present)

Discography

Studio albums

Extended plays

Compilation albums

Singles

Music videos

Awards and nominations

Notes

References

External links

Sea Girls' official website

2015 establishments in England
English rock music groups
English indie rock groups
Musical quartets
Musical groups from London